In graph theory, a cocoloring of a graph G is an assignment of colors to the vertices such that each color class forms an independent set in G or in the complement of G. The cochromatic number z(G) of G is the fewest colors needed in any cocolorings of G. The graphs with cochromatic number 2 are exactly the bipartite graphs, complements of bipartite graphs, and split graphs.

As the requirement that each color class be a clique or independent is weaker than the requirement for coloring (in which each color class must be an independent set) and stronger than for subcoloring (in which each color class must be a disjoint union of cliques), it follows that the cochromatic number of G is less than or equal to the chromatic number of G, and that it is greater than or equal to the subchromatic number of G.

References 

.
.
.
.
.
.

Graph coloring